The Stars We Are is the fourth studio album by British singer/songwriter Marc Almond. It was released in September 1988, reaching number 41 on the UK Albums Chart, and 144 on the US Billboard 200 album chart. It is Almond's highest selling solo album in both countries and was certified silver by the BPI. The Stars We Are includes the singles "Tears Run Rings", "Bitter Sweet", "Something's Gotten Hold of My Heart" and "Only the Moment".

With his assembled band La Magia (made up of former Willing Sinners members Annie Hogan, Billy McGee and Steve Humphreys) and accompanied by various studio musicians, Almond recorded the album at Matrix Studios in London. The artwork was designed by Huw Feather with a cover photograph by Andy Catlin.

Music and recording
The album includes a duet with the German singer Nico, titled "Your Kisses Burn", which was recorded shortly before her death. Almond also duets with Agnes Bernelle on the track "Kept Boy" (a bonus track on the CD and cassette versions of the album) and also with US singer Gene Pitney as they perform Pitney's 1967 hit "Something's Gotten Hold of My Heart". This version became a UK number one hit in early 1989 and was the UK's sixth best-selling single of that year, being certified Gold by the BPI.

Original editions of the album did not feature Almond's duet with Pitney on "Something's Gotten Hold of My Heart", and simply contained Almond's original solo version of the track instead. The duet version was recorded after the album was released and, after the success of the single in 1989, the duet was appended to CD and cassette versions and appeared in-place of the original solo version on some LP versions.

"Tears Run Rings" was Almond's only solo single to peak inside the US Billboard Hot 100.

Track listing

Personnel
Marc Almond – vocals, arrangements
Nico – vocals on "Your Kisses Burn"
Victoria Wilson-James – vocals on "These My Dreams Are Yours"
Suraya Ahmed – vocals on "She Took My Soul in Istanbul"
Gini Ball – violin
Sue Dench – viola
Julia Girdwood – oboe, cor Anglais
Derek Hannigan – bass clarinet
Sally Herbert – violin
Annie Hogan – piano, marimba, vibraphone, arranger
Philippa Holland – violin
Steven Humphreys – drums, percussion, programming, timpani, sampling
Christine Jackson – cello
Bob Kraushaar – additional percussion, mixing, producer on "Something's Gotten Hold of My Heart"
Billy McGee – bass, keyboards, doubek, string arranger, string conductor
Chris Pitsillides – viola
Jocelyn Pook – viola
Audrey Riley – cello
Enrico Tomasso – trumpet, flugelhorn
Chris Tombling – violin
Audrey Ahmed – vocals
Agnes Bernelle – vocals

Charts

Certifications

References

1988 albums
Marc Almond albums
Capitol Records albums
Parlophone albums
Some Bizzare Records albums